Sridharan Madhusudhanan (born 13 January 1966 ) is an Indian diplomat and author. He was posted as the spokesperson and head of the press, information and culture division of the Embassy of India, Washington, D.C., where he worked till June 2016. He wrote the first direct translation book from Chinese to Tamil language, called Vaari choodinum paarppavar illai (Even if I adorn; there's none to behold) and first book to introduce Chinese language in Tamil.

Madhusudhanan assumed his responsibilities as head of press, information and culture wing and the spokesperson of the Embassy of India in Washington in February 2013.  As minister at the embassy, he headed the department dealing with press relations and media management, and cultural relations including institutional linkages, literature, performing arts, exhibitions, films, publications, scholars and distinguished visitors exchange programs. He also dealt with digital diplomatic initiatives as well as Indian chairs in the US universities and outreach programs.

He wrote Even if I Adorn, There's None to Behold – Book of Songs, the first-ever direct translation between Chinese and Tamil and ‘Chinese Language – an Introduction’ in Tamil language.

References

1966 births
Indian diplomats
Living people
Colorado State University alumni
Translators to Tamil
Translators from Chinese